Yauheni Alyaksandravich Yakauchuk (born 19 January 1986) is a Belarusian male badminton player. He won the Belarusian National Badminton Championships in men's singles event from 2007-2015.

Achievements

BWF International Challenge/Series
Men's Doubles

 BWF International Challenge tournament
 BWF International Series tournament
 BWF Future Series tournament

References

External links
 

1986 births
Living people
Belarusian male badminton players